Naduve Antaravirali (Kannada: ನಡುವೆ ಅಂತರವಿರಲಿ) is a 2018 Kannada romantic drama film written and directed by Raveen Kumaara, produced by Raveen Kumaara and G. K. Nagaraja. It co-stars Prakhyath Paramesh alongside  Aishani Shetty in the lead roles. Achyuth Kumar, Chikkanna, Tulasi Shivamani, Aruna Balraj and Srinivas Prabhu feature in supporting roles. This is the remake of the Tamil film Aadhalal Kadhal Seiveer (2013).
Also dubbed in Odia as Ei Bodhe Prema.

Plot

Naduve Antaravirali opens with Sanjay (Prakhyath Paramesh), an engineering student, tries to propose his love for his college-mate Nithya (Aishani Shetty) in a moving bus and getting injured after falling down due to her rejection. After some initial tries, the two fall in love, but it gets difficult when they get involved in an intimate relationship, ignoring academics and warnings. They soon face the consequences for the same. It ends with some message to college students to fall in love, but not to cross the limits and instead concentrate on academics.

Cast
 Prakhyath Paramesh as Sanjay
 Aishani Shetty as Nithya
 Achyuth Kumar
 Chikkanna
 Tulasi Shivamani
 Aruna Balraj
 Srinivas Prabhu

Production
The shooting of the movie started and finished in 2018. Shooting was completed in 48 days.

Soundtrack
The music of the movie has been composed by Manikanth Kadri. The movie has five songs.

Awards
 66th Filmfare Awards South: Best Playback Singer (Male): Sanjith Hegde — Shaakuntle Sikkalu

References

External links 

 

2018 films
Teenage pregnancy in film
Indian romantic drama films
2010s Kannada-language films
2018 romantic drama films
Films set in Karnataka
Films shot in Karnataka
Indian pregnancy films
Kannada remakes of Tamil films